Lithuania, at the 1998 European Athletics Championships held in Hungary. In this European Championship started 16 athletes who represented Lithuania.

Results

Nations at the 1998 European Athletics Championships
1998
European Athletics Championships